Sanddollars is the debut EP by American band Why?. It was released by Anticon on May 9, 2005. It is the band's first release, having been formed in 2004; prior to this, the name 'Why?' had been used by Yoni Wolf as his stage name for his solo work.

Critical reception
At Metacritic, which assigns a weighted average score out of 100 to reviews from mainstream critics, Sanddollars received an average score of 80% based on 10 reviews, indicating "generally favorable reviews".

Track listing

Personnel
Credits adapted from liner notes.

 Yoni Wolf – music, layout
 Josiah Wolf – music
 Doug McDiarmid – music
 Matt Meldon – music
 John Ringhofer – trombone (1, 7)
 Doseone – vocals (4)
 Kim Contreras – vocals (4)
 Anna Stewart – vocals (7)
 Tony Espinoza – mixing
 Brian Gardner – mastering
 Jessica Miller – photography
 Odd Nosdam – layout

References

External links
 

2005 debut EPs
Why? (American band) albums
Anticon EPs